Lindokuhle Nduduzo Sibankulu (born 9 April 1981) is a South African basketball player with the APN of Mozambique's professional basketball league. He is also a member of the South Africa national basketball team and appeared with the club at the 2005 and 2009 African Championships.

References

1981 births
Living people
South African men's basketball players